Vapila is a village in the municipality of Ohrid, North Macedonia. It used to be part of the former municipality of Kosel.

Name
Vapila's name derives from a typical Balkan Macedonian Ottoman dish of the area, pilev and was originally called Vapile.

History
The village was initially settled by three Macedonian Christian family's around 1830, one of which was the Sandakovci or Shandakovtsi who originated from Peskopeja.

Demographics
According to the 2002 census, the village had a total of 112 inhabitants. Ethnic groups in the village include:

Macedonians 112

References

Villages in Ohrid Municipality